I'm Dreaming is the debut studio album by Australian electronic musician and producer Alice Ivy, released on 9 February 2018 by Dew Process in Australia and New Zealand and by Last Gang Records internationally. It was written, composed, and produced by Alice Ivy under her real name; Annika Schmarsel.

Background and promotion
The album contains many of Alice Ivy's previously released standalone singles. "Charlie" featuring Georgia van Etten, originally released on 3 January 2015. The second single "Touch" also featuring van Etten, originally released on 25 January 2016 with its music video later released in February. The third single, "Almost Here" featuring RaRa, was originally released on 23 June 2016. The fourth single, "Get Me a Drink" featuring E^ST and Charlie Threads, was originally released on 9 March 2017. The fifth and final single, "Be Friends" featuring Cazeaux O.S.L.O. and Tim De Cotta, was released on 22 September 2017.

From February to March 2018, Alice Ivy performed an eight date headline tour to promote her debut album. On all East Coast dates, Alice Ivy was accompanied by Melbourne soul artist Nasty Mars, with local opening slots going to Oh Boy, Keelan Mak, François, Sophiegrophy, Strictface & Skivvybeats.

Writing and composition
All songs on the album were written by Alice Ivy herself. The album is supported by many guest vocalists including; Georgia van Etten,  Cazeaux O.S.L.O., Tim De Cotta, Bertie Blackman, RaRa, E^ST, and Charlie Threads. The track "Touch" contains samples from the 1951 Alice in Wonderland film. The track "Charlie" contains soundbites from various television commercials from the 1950s. The track "Chasing Stars" tells the story of "Lincoln Beachey, the first person to do a loop to loop in an airplane. The music has many layers which depict the endless landscape of the sky."

The album's genre has been described as chillwave, downtempo, electronic, while also incorporating elements of plunderphonics, neo-psychedelia, nu jazz, big beat, and hip hop.

Critical reception

The album received positive reviews. LunchBox rated the album 4/5 and said: "It is easy to be taken away into a tranquil state of mind when listening to this record." Rating the album positively, Sarah Pritchard from Altmedia said: "Alice Ivy's debut is a creative triumph and an example of how not to lose heart when surrounded by too much choice, the album is the result of a discerning, musically trained mind." Paul Waxman of Beat rated it positively, saying: "Alice Ivy's impressive debut really is a dream, each track taking the listener to a new but familiar place. And like every good dream, you feel sad once it's over." Sungenre, in a positive review said: "I'm Dreaming is an impressive effort from an all-in-one breakout producer who should be monitored closely."

Track listing

Notes 
 Georgia van Etten is featured in "Charlie" but is only credited on the single's SoundCloud page, not in the track's title.

Personnel
Credits adapted from SoundCloud.

Musicians
 Annika Schmarsel - guitar, vocals, mixing, mastering, writing, producer 

Additional musicians
 Georgia van Etten – vocals 
 Cazeaux O.S.L.O. – vocals 
 Tim de Cotta – vocals 
 Bertie Blackman – vocals 
 RaRa – vocals 
 E^ST – vocals 
 Charlie Threads – vocals 
 Connor Black Harry – backing vocals 
 Luy Amiel – guitar 
 Sam Dowson – drums

Technical
 Ben Coe – mastering 
 Phil Threlfall – mixing 
 Cam Bluff – mixing 
 Simon Lam – mastering

Release history

References

Alice Ivy albums
2018 debut albums
Dew Process albums